Tiruttelicheri Parvatheeswarar Temple( திருத்தெளிச்சேரி பார்வதீசுவரர் கோயில்
])is a Hindu temple located at Tiruttelicheri in Pondicherry, India. Now the place is known as Koilpatthu. The presiding deity is Shiva. He is called as Parvatheeswarar. His consort is known as 
Parvathi Ammai.

Significance 
It is one of the shrines of the 275 Paadal Petra Sthalams - Shiva Sthalams glorified in the early medieval Tevaram poems by Tamil Saivite Nayanar Tirugnanasambandar.

Literary mention 
Tirugnanasambandar describes the feature of the deity as:

References

External links

Photogallery

Shiva temples in Puducherry
Padal Petra Stalam